Azalia Suhaimi (born 18 May 1985) is a Malaysian storyteller, poet and artist. She combines various medium in telling stories and in raising awareness on matters important to her. Some of the medium she uses include poetry, illustrations, photography and videography.

Background 
Born in Kuala Lumpur, Azalia Suhaimi grew up and went to school in a small town called Ipoh. She enjoyed writing from a young age and began majoring in English Literature at high school. 

She first experimented with the art of photography when she bought her first compact camera before flying off to Sydney, Australia for her tertiary education. Her love for photography grew when she went travelling around Australia during her university years. This led to her signing up for a proper course on photography at the College of Fine Arts, the creative arts faculty of the University of New South Wales, Australia. Despite studying photography in a short course, she claims to prefer taking photographs with an artistic outlook and with her heart, instead of focusing solely on a camera's technical functions.  

Her love for both writing and photography was made public when she created a blog called Photopoetry. In addition to photography, Azalia Suhaimi also explored her skills in videography.

Azalia Suhaimi graduated with a degree in accountancy from the University of New South Wales, and then later in life decided to also pursue her passion by completing a Diploma in English Literature at the University of Cambridge.

She further explored her artistic skills by creating digital illustrations to raise awareness on maternal mental health.

Her words, art, photography and videography have been widely shared across social media, mainly to an audience of new mothers.

Awards and publications 
Her website, Azalia Suhaimi Photopoetry was ranked as part of the 100 Best Poetry Blogs by the Accredited Online Colleges website. Some of her photopoetry works have been published in the Live and Inspire online magazine under the Creative Arts section every now and then. Outside the world of art, Azalia Suhaimi has also expressed her views on her country in the local Malaysian newspaper known as The Star.

Azalia is known to be currently working on a book which compiles all of her best photopoetry works.

Exhibitions 
Azalia first began exhibiting her photography works during her university years at the University of New South Wales, particularly in her Colour Photography summer course at the College of Fine Arts. She also participated in an international photography competition organised by the International Student Services of the University of New South Wales, Australia whereby her works were exhibited together with those of other students from all over the world.

Azalia actively participated in a number of art exhibitions and events in Malaysia when she came back home for good after graduating from Australia in year 2008. Among some of her participation included the Rantai Art Festival (2008), KLUE Urbanscapes (2009 and 2010) and also the Kuala Lumpur Design Week (2009 and 2010). Her recent exhibition at the Kuala Lumpur Design Week 2010 showed both her photography and poetry works clipped around a tent she designed on her own. Throughout all her exhibitions, Azalia also sold collectible postcards she designed with her own quotes and photography.

References

External links 
 

Malaysian bloggers
Malaysian photographers
Malaysian poets
Malaysian writers
1985 births
Living people
Malaysian women artists
Malaysian women writers
Malaysian women bloggers
Malaysian women photographers
Malaysian women poets
Malaysian people of Malay descent
People from Kuala Lumpur
21st-century Malaysian people
21st-century photographers
21st-century poets
21st-century Malaysian women writers
21st-century women photographers